Austin Township is located in Macon County, Illinois. As of the 2010 census, its population was 214 and it contained 98 housing units.

Geography

Demographics

Adjacent townships 
 Tunbridge Township, DeWitt County (north)
 Texas Township, DeWitt County (northeast)
 Maroa Township (east)
 Hickory Point Township (southeast)
 Illini Township (south)
 Lake Fork Township, Logan County (southwest)
 Laenna Township, Logan County (west)
 Aetna Township, Logan County (northwest)

References

External links
US Census
City-data.com
Illinois State Archives

Townships in Macon County, Illinois
1859 establishments in Illinois
Populated places established in 1859
Townships in Illinois